Mezőcsokonya is a village in Somogy county, Hungary.

Gallery

References

External links 
 Street map (Hungarian)

Populated places in Somogy County